The International Geographical Union (IGU; , UGI) is an international geographical society. The first International Geographical Congress was held in Antwerp in 1871. Subsequent meetings led to the establishment of the permanent organization in Brussels, Belgium, in 1922.

The International Geographical Union adheres to the International Science Council (ISC), which it recognizes as the coordinating body for the international organisations of science.

Objectives 
The IGU has seven objectives or aims:

 to promote the study of geographical problems;
 to initiate and co-ordinate geographical research requiring international co-operation and to promote its scientific discussion and publication;
 to provide for the participation of geographers in the work of relevant international organizations;
 to facilitate the collection and diffusion of geographical data and documentation in and between all member countries;
 to promote International Geographical Congresses, regional conferences and specialized symposia related to the objectives of the Union;
 to participate in any other appropriate form of international co-operation with the object of advancing the study and application of geography;
 to promote international standardization or compatibility of methods, nomenclature, and symbols employed in geography.

Senior Officers 
The following lists contain the Senior Officers of the IGU from 1922 to present:

Presidents 
 2021–present Michael Meadows, South Africa
 2016–21 Yukio Himiyama, Japan
 2012–16 Vladimir Aleksandrovich Kolosov, Russian Federation
 2008–12 Ronald Francis Abler, United States
 2006–08 José Palacio-Prieto, Mexico, acting
 2004–06 Adalberto Vallega, Italy, died in office
 2000–04 Anne Buttimer, Ireland
 1996–2000 Bruno Messerli, Switzerland
 1992–96 Herman Th. Verstappen, Netherlands
 1988–92 Roland J. Fuchs, United States
 1984–88 Peter Scott, Australia
 1980–84 Akin L. Mabogunje, Nigeria
 1976–80 Michael J. Wise, United Kingdom
 1972–76 Jean Dresch, France
 1968–72 Stanisław Leszczycki, Poland
 1964–68 Shiba P. Chatterjee, India
 1960–64 Carl Troll, Germany
 1956–60 Hans Wilhelmsson Ahlmann, Sweden
 1952–56 L. Dudley Stamp, United Kingdom
 1949–52 George B. Cressey, United States
 1938–49 Emmanuel de Martonne, France
 1934–38 Sir Charles Close, United Kingdom
 1931–34 Isaiah Bowman, United States
 1928–31 General Robert Bourgeois, France
 1924–28 General Nicola Vacchelli, Italy
 1922–24 Prince Roland Bonaparte, France

Secretaries-General and Treasurers 
 2021–present Barbaros Gönençgil, Turkey, acting
 2010–20 Michael Meadows, South Africa
 2008–10 Yu Woo-ik, South Korea
 2000–08 Ronald Francis Abler, United States
 1992–2000 Eckart Ehlers, Germany
 1984–92 Leszek A. Kosiński, Canada
 1976–84 Walther Manshard, Germany
 1968–76 Chauncy D. Harris, United States
 1956–68 Hans Boesch, Switzerland
 1949–56 George H. T. Kimble, Canada
 1940-49 Marguerite Lefèvre, Belgium
 1938–40 Paul Michotte, Belgium
 1931–38 Emmanuel de Martonne, France
 1928–31 Filippo De Filippi, Italy
 1922–28 Sir Charles Close, United Kingdom

Commissions and Task Forces 
The IGU is organized into a number of commissions and task forces that deal with specific topics.

The commission topics include e.g. specific approaches (e.g. Applied Geography), topics (e.g. Climatology, Health and Environment), methods (e.g. Geographical Information Science), and spatial examples (e.g. Mediterranean Basin). There are also commissions for the International Olympiad and Geographical Education.

The two task forces are "Young and Early-Career Geographers" and "Centennial and Sesquicentennial".

IGU-CGE 
The IGU-CGE (Commission on Geographical Education) focuses on geography education. It is currently headed by co-chairs Clare Brooks (UK) and Chew-Hung Chang (Singapore).

It publishes the IRGEE journal and organizes yearly conferences. The "International Charter on Geographical Education" constitutes an international agreement on different aspects of geography education with global impacts. The 2016 charter features important geography education research questions and policy recommendations. As such the charter is: Convinced that geographical education is indispensable to the development of responsible and active citizens in the present and future world; Conscious that geography can be an informing, enabling and stimulating subject at all levels in education, and contributes to a lifelong
enjoyment and understanding of our world; Aware that students require increasing international competence in order to ensure effective cooperation on a broad range of economic, political, cultural and environmental issues in a shrinking world; Concerned that geographical education is neglected in some parts of the world, and lacks structure and coherence in others; Ready to assist colleagues in counteracting geographical illiteracy in all countries of the world.
 In the 1992 charter there is also information on geographic questions, key concepts, approaches and the selection of spatial examples.

List of congresses
International Geographical Congresses have been held as follows:

Notes

References 

 Kish, George (1992) "International Geographical Union: A Brief History" GeoJournal 26, No. 2:224-228 ISSN 0343-2521
 Marie-Claire Robic, Anne-Marie Briend, Mechtild Rössler (eds.) (1996) Geographers to the world. The International Geographical Union and the International Geographical Congress Paris: L'Harmattan 
 Dunbar, Gary S. (2001) Geography: Discipline, Profession and Subject since 1870: An International Survey Kluwer Academic Publishers  pg 36
 Lidstone, John; Williams, Michael (2006) Geographical Education in a Changing World: Past Experience, Current Trends and Future Challenges Springer  pg 39
 International Geographical Union (IGU)
 Royal Irish Academy (RIA)

External links 
 International Geographical Union/Union Géographique Internationale
 International Geographical Union - Russian National Committee

Geographic societies
International organisations based in Belgium
Members of the International Council for Science
International geographic data and information organizations
Members of the International Science Council